Montmarault is a commune in the Allier department in central France.

Population

Tourism
The Petite Valette campground has been named the best camping of the Auvergne by the German ADAC.

See also
Communes of the Allier department

References

Communes of Allier
Allier communes articles needing translation from French Wikipedia